San Mateo is a town and municipality in the Northern Boyacá Province, part of the Colombian department of Boyacá. San Mateo borders Guacamayas, Panqueba and El Cocuy in the east, Boavita in the west, Macaravita, Santander in the north and La Uvita in the south.

Etymology 
Before 1914, San Mateo was called La Capilla. It received its present name honouring the San Mateo field, where Antonio Ricaurte, hero of the Independence of Colombia died for the fatherland.

History 
The history of San Mateo is not well documented. The foundation of the town has been attributed by Ramón Correa to Archbishop of Bogotá Antonio Caballero y Góngora on September 21, 1773, while Caballero was working in Córdoba, Spain. Little data exists in the archives for the tumultuous period of civil wars of the republican era.

The symbol of San Mateo is the typical Colombian fruit chirimoya.

Economy 
The economy of San Mateo is centered around agriculture with potatoes, maize, beans, wheat, tobacco, pea and coffee as main products cultivated. The municipality also has livestock farming and mining activities of sand, gravel and carbon.

Born in San Mateo 
 Luis Espinosa, former professional cyclist
 Gregorio Ladino, former professional cyclist

Gallery

References

Notes 

Municipalities of Boyacá Department
Populated places established in 1773
1773 establishments in the Spanish Empire